Chena Achena ( known strangers) is a 1999 Bengali drama film directed by Subhas Sen and produced by Sukumar Bhadra. The film has been music composed by Anupam Dutta.

Cast
 Biplab Chatterjee
 Abhishek Chatterjee
 Rituparna Sengupta
 Victor Banerjee
 Subhendu Chatterjee

Soundtrack
"Jake Ei Mon Chay" - Kavita Krishnamurthy
"Choi Choi Choi Tipi Tipi" - Monali Thakur (first song of her career)
"Ekti Shalik Dekhini Toh" - Sonu Nigam, Sadhana Sargam
"Tumi Ele Mone Holo" - Alka Yagnik, Abhijeet Bhattacharya
"Janina Mon, Ki Je Karon" - Alka Yagnik

References

External links
 Chena Achena (1999) at the Gomolo

Bengali-language Indian films
1999 films
1990s Bengali-language films
Films scored by Anupam Dutta